Phra Tabong Province was a province of Thailand, from the late-18th century until it was ceded to French Indochina in 1907, and again between 1941-1946 after Thailand recaptured it during the Japanese occupation of Cambodia in World War II. The province was dissolved and returned to Cambodia in 1946. The area is now in Battambang Province, Cambodia.

Name
Phra Tabong is the Thai version of the name Preah Bat Dambang Kranhung, the namesake of Battambang, who according to Khmer legend threw his staff from Angkor, landing in the area of modern Battambang.

History

Though Siam had invaded this area of Cambodia at the beginning of the 15th century, Siamese administration of the area was only formally organized in the late-18th century, at the beginning of the Bangkok Period known as Inner Cambodia or Khamen Nai. Baen Abhaiwongse, of the Abhaiwongse family, was installed as governor, with the title Chao Phraya Abhayabhubet. His family governed Phra Tabong as the provincial capital for another five generations, until 1907. In that year Phra Tabong, along with Siemmarat and Sisophon, was ceded to French Indochina in exchange for Trat Province and Dan Sai, in accordance with the Franco-Siam Treaty signed 23 March 1907.

In 1941, with the help of its ally, Japan, which occupied Thailand at the time, Thailand recaptured the areas it had ceded to France in 1907. The area in Cambodia had since been subdivided, and was rejoined to Thailand on 23 July 1941 as three provinces: Phra Tabong Province (with new boundaries, corresponding to Cambodian Battambang Province), Nakhon Champassak Province, and Phibunsongkhram Province (corresponding to Cambodian Siem Reap Province).

Thailand was forced to cede the territory again in 1946, after the end of World War II, as a condition for Thailand's admission into the United Nations.

Administrative divisions
When it was rejoined to Thailand on 23 July 1941, Phra Tabong was divided into seven districts (amphoe):

Three of the former Cambodian districts were renamed to honor the military officers who led the three major divisions of the Thai armed forces in the French-Thai War:
 Phromyothi was renamed for Colonel Luang Phromyothi (common name Mangkon Phromyothi, later General), who commanded army troops.
 Athuekthewadet was renamed for Air Marshal Luang Athuekthewadet (common name Bunchiam Komonmit), who commanded airmen.
 Renamed in 1943 to Ronnaphakat, after Luang Athuekthewadet quit his position.
 Sinthusongkhramchai was renamed for Rear Admiral Luang Sinthusongkhramchai (common name Sin Kamonnawin, later Admiral), who commanded the fleet.

On 23 December 1941, Si Sophon and Sinthu Songkhram Chai were reassigned to Phibunsongkhram Province.

On 3 November 1942, Mueang Phra Tabong was established as a town (thesaban mueang).

On 17 September 1943, due to its small size, Phromyothi District was downgraded to a minor district (king amphoe) and renamed Pak Phraek. At the same time, four sub-districts from Mongkhon Buri District were combined into a new Phromyothi District.

See also
Japanese occupation of Cambodia
 Thailand in World War II

References

External links
The Land Boundaries of Indochina: Cambodia, Laos and Vietnam

Former provinces of Thailand

th:จังหวัดพระตะบอง